Woman Kills Injured Man is a 1994 painting by the Norwegian artist Odd Nerdrum. It depicts a man who is assaulted by a woman armed with a knife.

The painting is in the collections of the Astrup Fearnley Museum of Modern Art in Oslo.

Description
In a dark, rocky coastal landscape, a nude man with open mouth and twisted arms is falling headlong toward the ground. A nude woman armed with a knife is hanging in the air, falling over the man or clinging to his leg. In the background to the right are three additional people who observe the two in the foreground.

Themes
The subject of a man and a woman in lethal struggle recurs in several of Nerdrum's paintings from the 1990s, such as Buried Alive from 1996. In his 1998 book Odd Nerdrum: Storyteller and Self-Revealer, the art historian and Nerdrum scholar Jan Åke Pettersson interprets Woman Kills Injured Man through a personal crisis Nerdrum had gone through. In the mid 1980s Nerdrum had a relationship with a female student. He left his family for her, but was rejected when she was accepted to the Norwegian National Academy of Fine Arts. As a reaction, Nerdrum went to her home and slashed the paintings he had given her. According to Pettersson, this episode is also reflected in paintings such as Woman with Fish, Mann med steinbit and Man Bitten by a Snake.

References

1994 paintings
Nude art
Paintings by Odd Nerdrum
Paintings in the collection of the Astrup Fearnley Museum of Modern Art
Paintings about death